Alex Michael Faedo (born November 12, 1995) is an American professional baseball pitcher for the Detroit Tigers of Major League Baseball (MLB).

Amateur career
Faedo attended Braulio Alonso High School in Tampa, Florida. As a senior, he went 6–2 with a 0.58 earned run average (ERA) and 68 strikeouts in 48 innings. As a junior, he was 8–2 with a 1.15 ERA and threw a no-hitter. Faedo was drafted by the Detroit Tigers in the 40th round of the 2014 Major League Baseball draft, but did not sign and attended the University of Florida to play college baseball.

As a freshman at Florida in 2015, Faedo appeared in 17 games with 12 starts and went 6–1 with a 3.23 ERA and 59 strikeouts. As a sophomore in 2016, he started 17 games and went 13–3 with a 3.18 ERA and 133 strikeouts. After the season, Faedo played for the United States collegiate national team. As a junior in 2017, he started 17 games during the regular season, and went 7–2 with a 2.60 ERA, with 132 strikeouts over  innings pitched, and helped lead Florida to the College World Series, and win their first National Championship. During the College World Series, Faedo allowed five hits and no runs, with 22 strikeouts in  innings against TCU. He was named to the All-Tournament Team and awarded the College World Series Most Outstanding Player.

Professional career
Faedo was again selected by the Detroit Tigers, in the first round, 18th overall, of the 2017 Major League Baseball draft. He signed with the Tigers, but did not make his professional debut in 2017 and sat out the season due to his workload at Florida. Faedo began the 2018 season with the Lakeland Flying Tigers of the Class A-Advanced Florida State League. On June 18, the Tigers promoted Faedo to the Erie SeaWolves of the Class AA Eastern League. In 24 total starts between the two teams, he went 5–10 with a 4.02 ERA. Faedo returned to Erie to begin 2019. He made 22 starts for the 2019 SeaWolves, pitching to a 6–7 record with a 3.90 ERA and 134 strikeouts over  innings.

The Tigers added Faedo to their 40-man roster after the 2020 season. On December 19, 2020, the Tigers announced that Faedo would undergo Tommy John surgery on his throwing elbow which would cause him to sit out the entire 2021 season.

Fully recovered from surgery, Faedo started the 2022 season in Lakeland. He posted a 2.53 ERA in three appearances for the Flying Tigers before being sent to the Triple-A Toledo Mud Hens. After making just one start for Toledo, he was called up to the Tigers on May 4 and made his major league debut in the second game of a doubleheader against the Pittsburgh Pirates. He started and pitched five innings, allowing eight hits, two earned runs and one walk, while striking out one batter. He left the game with the score tied 2–2, receiving a no-decision. After making two starts, Faedo was returned to Toledo. He was brought up again by the Tigers on May 16, following an injury to Michael Pineda. He started the May 16 game against the Tampa Bay Rays, near his childhood home, and gave up just one run in  innings. In his next start on May 22, Faedo earned his first major league win, allowing two runs in  innings against the Cleveland Guardians. Once Pineda returned from the injured list on July 1, Faedo was optioned back to Toledo.

Personal life
Faedo is the nephew of former Minnesota Twins shortstop Lenny Faedo. His father, Landy Faedo, is a long-time high school baseball coach in the Tampa Bay area.

References

External links

Florida Gators bio

1995 births
Living people
Baseball players from Tampa, Florida
College World Series Most Outstanding Player Award winners
Detroit Tigers players
Erie SeaWolves players
Florida Gators baseball players
Lakeland Flying Tigers players
Major League Baseball pitchers
Toledo Mud Hens players